Josephus Yenay (born 5 September 1975) is a former Liberian football striker.

Career 
Yenay had a spell with Associação Naval 1º de Maio in the Portuguese Liga de Honra.

International career 
Yenay also made two appearances for the Liberia national football team. He was selected for the Liberia squad at the 2002 African Cup of Nations and made one appearance in the final tournament.

References

External links 
 

1975 births
Liberian footballers
Liberian expatriate footballers
Liberia international footballers
Living people
Swiss Super League players
Yverdon-Sport FC players
FC Sion players
FC Luzern players
Fluminense FC players
Associação Naval 1º de Maio players
SV Meppen players
Eintracht Braunschweig players
SV Eintracht Trier 05 players
C.F. União players
Expatriate footballers in Germany
Expatriate footballers in Brazil
Expatriate footballers in Portugal
Expatriate footballers in Switzerland
Expatriate footballers in Finland
Liberian expatriate sportspeople in Switzerland
2002 African Cup of Nations players
Association football forwards